A penumbral lunar eclipse took place on April 24, 2005, the first of two lunar eclipses in 2005. At maximum eclipse, 86.5% of the Moon's disc was partially shaded by the Earth, which caused a slight shadow gradient across its disc; this subtle effect may have been visible to careful observers. No part of the Moon was in complete shadow. The eclipse lasted 4 hours and 6 minutes overall, and was visible from east Asia, Australia, and the Americas.

Visibility

Member 
This is the 23rd member of Lunar Saros 141. The previous event was the April 1987 lunar eclipse. The next event is the May 2023 lunar eclipse.

Related eclipses

Eclipse season 

This is the second eclipse this season.

First eclipse this season: 8 April 2005 Hybrid Solar Eclipse

Eclipses of 2005
 A hybrid solar eclipse on April 8.
 A penumbral lunar eclipse on April 24.
 An annular solar eclipse on October 3.
 A partial lunar eclipse on October 17.

Lunar eclipse 2002-2005
It is the last of four lunar year cycles, repeating every 354 days.

Saros series 

Lunar Saros 141, repeating every 18 years and 11 days, has a total of 72 lunar eclipse events including 26 total lunar eclipses.

First Penumbral Lunar Eclipse: 1608 Aug 25

First Partial Lunar Eclipse: 2041 May 16

First Total Lunar Eclipse: 2167 Aug 01

First Central Lunar Eclipse: 2221 Sep 02

Greatest Eclipse of the Lunar Saros 141: 2293 Oct 16

Last Central Lunar Eclipse: 2546 Mar 18

Last Total Lunar Eclipse: 2618 May 01

Last Partial Lunar Eclipse: 2744 Jul 16

Last Penumbral Lunar Eclipse: 2888 Oct 11

1901-2100

March 1915 lunar eclipse

March 1933 lunar eclipse

March 1951 lunar eclipse

April 1969 lunar eclipse

April 1987 lunar eclipse

April 2005 lunar eclipse

May 2023 lunar eclipse

May 2041 lunar eclipse

May 2059 lunar eclipse

June 2077 lunar eclipse

June 2095 lunar eclipse

Metonic series 
This eclipse is the last of four Metonic cycle lunar eclipses on the same date, April 23–24, each separated by 19 years:

Half-Saros cycle
A lunar eclipse will be preceded and followed by solar eclipses by 9 years and 5.5 days (a half saros). This lunar eclipse is related to two solar eclipses of Solar Saros 148.

Tzolkinex 
 Preceded: Lunar eclipse of March 13, 1998

 Followed: Lunar eclipse of June 4, 2012

See also 
 List of lunar eclipses and List of 21st-century lunar eclipses
 May 2003 lunar eclipse
 November 2003 lunar eclipse
 May 2004 lunar eclipse
 :File:2005-04-24 Lunar Eclipse Sketch.gif Chart

References

External links
 Saros cycle 141
 
 Photo 

2005-04
2005 in science